Wallingford Constantine Riegger (April 29, 1885 – April 2, 1961) was an American modernist composer and pianist, best known for his orchestral and modern dance music. He was born in Albany, Georgia, but spent most of his career in New York City, helping elevate the status of other American composers such as Charles Ives and Henry Cowell. Riegger is noted for being one of the first American composers to use a form of serialism and the twelve-tone technique.

Life 
Riegger was born in 1885 to Constantine Riegger and Ida Riegger (née Wallingford). After his father's lumber mill burned down in 1888, his family moved to Indianapolis, and later to Louisville, finally settling in New York in 1900. A gifted cellist, he was a member of the first graduating class of the Institute of Musical Art, later known as the Juilliard School, in 1907, after studying under Percy Goetschius. He continued his studies at the Hochschule für Musik in Berlin for three years. After returning in 1910, he married Rose Schramm in 1911, with whom he later had three daughters. He returned to Germany and served in various conducting positions until the United States entered World War I in 1917, after which he moved back to America.

From 1918 to 1922, he taught music theory and violoncello at Drake University. During the greater part of the time from 1930 to 1956, he continued to compose and publish while he taught at various colleges in New York State, notably the Institute of Musical Art and Ithaca College. In 1957, he was called before the House Un-American Activities Committee, which was investigating communism in the musical world. In 1958, Leonard Bernstein honored him by conducting his Music for Orchestra with the New York Philharmonic Orchestra. He died in New York in 1961 when he tripped over the leashes of two fighting dogs, resulting in a fall and a head injury from which he did not recover despite treatment.  Bernstein said of him in his eulogy, "All who knew Wally loved him."

His students included Robert Ashley, Louise Spizizen, Alan Stout and Merton Brown.

Musical style 

Riegger was known for his use of a twelve-tone system, related to that of Schoenberg. He became familiar with the technique through Schoenberg's American student Adolph Weiss. However, he did not use it in all of his compositions and his usage varied from that of Schoenberg, for example in not always using rows with twelve tones and not using transposed forms of the rows. Riegger's Dance Rhythms, for example, did not use these techniques. Aside from Schoenberg, Riegger was also significantly influenced by his friends Henry Cowell and Charles Ives.

Early period 
Early on in his career as a composer, the style of his compositions was markedly different from that of his later work, which mostly used the twelve-tone system. His compositions, following those of Goetschius, were somewhat romanticist.

Later period 
Starting in the mid-1930s, Riegger began to write contemporary dance music. Later, as his career progressed, he began to use Schoenberg's twelve-tone technique more and more often, though he did occasionally revert to his earlier styles. From 1941 on, he focused almost solely on instrumental music. His Symphony No. 3 received the New York Music Critics' Circle Award and a Naumburg Foundation Recording Award.

Selected works 
Orchestral
 Fantasy and Fugue, Op. 10 (1930)
 Dichotomy, Op. 12 (1931)
 Consummation, Op. 31 (1939)
 Passacaglia and Fugue, Op. 34a (1942)
 Symphony No. 1 (1944)
 Symphony No. 2 (1945)
 Symphony No. 3, Op. 42 (1946–1947, revised 1960)
 Music for Orchestra, Op. 50 (1958)
 Suite for Younger Orchestras, Op. 56 (1953)
 Romanza for string orchestra, Op. 56a (1953); Lullaby from the Suite for Younger Orchestras
 Dance Rhythms, Op. 58 (1954)
 Overture, Op. 60 (1955)
 Preamble and Fugue, Op. 61 (1955)
 Symphony No. 4, Op. 63 (1956)
 Festival Overture, Op. 68 (1957)
 Quintuple Jazz, Op. 72 (1958)
 Sinfonietta, Op. 73 (1959)
 Canon and Fugue for string orchestra

Concert band and wind ensemble
 Ballet for Band, Op. 18 (1935)
 Passacaglia and Fugue, Op. 34 (1942)
 Processional, Op. 36 (1943)
 Music for Brass Choir, Op. 45 (1949)
 Prelude and Fugue, Op. 52 (1953)
 Dance Rhythms, Op. 58a (1954); original for orchestra

Concertante
 Elegy for cello and orchestra (1916)
 Concerto for piano with wind quintet, Op. 53 (1953)
 Variations for piano and orchestra, Op. 54 (1952–1953)
 Variations for violin and orchestra, Op. 71 (1959)
 Introduction and Fugue for cello and concert band, Op. 74 (1960)

Chamber music
 Elegy for viola and piano (1915)
 Piano Trio in B minor, Op. 1 (1919)
 Revery for cello (or viola) and piano (1920)
 Lullaby for cello (or viola) and piano (1922)
 Study in Sonority for 10 violins or any multiple thereof, Op. 7 (1927)
 Suite for flute solo, Op. 8 (1929)
 String Quartet No. 1, Op. 30 (1938–1939)
 Duos for Three Woodwinds for flute, oboe, clarinet, Op. 35 (1944)
 Sonatina for violin and piano, Op. 39 (1948)
 String Quartet No. 2, Op. 43 (1948)
 Piano Quintet, Op. 47 (1951)
 Nonet for Brass, Op. 49 (1951)
 Woodwind Quintet, Op. 51 (1952)
 Variations for violin and viola (soli or in choirs), Op. 57 (1956)
 Etudes for clarinet solo (1957)
 String Quartet No. 3 (1957)
 Movement for 2 trumpets, trombone and piano, Op. 66
 Introduction and Fugue for 4 cellos or cello orchestra, Op. 69 (1962)

Piano
 Blue Voyage, Rhapsody, Op. 6 (1927)
 New Dance for 2 pianos (1932)
 The Cry for piano 4-hands, Op. 22 (1935)
 Four Tone Pictures (1939)
 New and Old, Op. 38 (1944)
 Petite Étude, Op. 62 (1956)
 Evocation for piano 4-hands, Op. 17
 Scherzo for 2 pianos
 Skip to My Lou, Duet for 2 pianos
 The Galway Piper, Duet for 2 pianos
 The Harold Flammer Duet Album, Folk Songs arranged for piano 4-hands

Accordion
 Cooper Square

Vocal
 La Belle Dame sans Merci (setting of John Keats' poem, for two sopranos, contralto, tenor, violin, viola, cello, double bass, oboe (English horn), clarinet and French horn; premiered 19 September 1924, at the 7th Berkshire Festival of Chamber Music)

Choral
 Dark Eyes, Russian Folksong, SSA, piano
 Veni Jesu (arrangement)

References

Further reading 
Freeman, Paul Douglas. The Compositional Technique of Wallingford Riegger as Seen in Seven Major Twelve-Tone Works. Ph.D. dissertation: University of Rochester, 1963.
Gatwood, Dwight D. Wallingford Riegger: A Biography and Analysis. Ph.D. dissertation: George Peabody College for Teachers, 1970.
Ott, Leonard William. An Analysis of the Late Orchestral Style of Wallingford Riegger. Ph.D. dissertation: Michigan State University, 1970.
Savage, Gene. Structure and Cadence in the Music of Wallingford Riegger. Ph.D. dissertation: Stanford University, 1972.
Schmoll, Joseph Benjamin. An Analytical Study of the Principal Instrumental Compositions of Wallingford Riegger. Ph.D. dissertation: Northwestern University, 1954.
Spackman, Stephen. Wallingford Riegger: Two Essays in Musical Biography. Institute for Studies in American Music Monographs, No. 17. Brooklyn, NY: Institute for Studies in American Music, Conservatory of Music, Brooklyn College of the City University of New York, 1982.
Weiss, Adolph. "Wallingford Riegger" in American Composers on American Music: A Symposium. Edited by Henry Cowell. New York: F. Ungar, 1962.

1885 births
1961 deaths
20th-century American composers
20th-century American educators
20th-century American male musicians
20th-century American musicians
20th-century American pianists
20th-century classical composers
20th-century classical pianists
20th-century male musicians
Accidental deaths from falls
Accidental deaths in New York (state)
American classical composers
American classical musicians
American classical pianists
American contemporary classical composers
American experimental musicians
American male classical composers
American male classical pianists
American music educators
American people of English descent
American people of German descent
American Romantic composers
Drake University faculty
Experimental composers
Ithaca College faculty
Juilliard School alumni
Modernist composers
Music & Arts artists
Musicians from Albany, Georgia
Musicians from Georgia (U.S. state)
Pupils of Percy Goetschius
Twelve-tone and serial composers